Burwash Airport  is located  northwest of Burwash Landing, Yukon, Canada, and is operated by the Yukon government.

References

External links 
Yukon Government Airports/Aerodromes
Burwash Airport on COPA's Places to Fly airport directory

Registered aerodromes in Yukon